The white-winged cuckooshrike (Edolisoma ostentum), also known as white-winged cicadabird or white-winged graybird, is a species of bird in the family Campephagidae.
It is endemic to the Philippines found on the islands of Negros, Panay and formerly (now extinct) on Guimaras. Some taxonomists place this species in the genus Analisoma.

Its natural habitats are tropical moist lowland forest.
It is threatened by habitat loss.

Description 
EBird describes the bird as "A medium-sized, fairly long-tailed bird of forest and edge from the lowlands to middle elevations in the mountains on Panay and Negros. Gray on the crown, back, and rump. Has black wings with a large white patch, a black tail with white tips, and white under the base of the tail. Male has a black forehead, face, and chest, whereas the female has pale gray underparts. Similar to Bar-bellied cuckooshrike, but smaller, lacking the barring on the belly, with white on the wing. Voice includes a harsh rising and falling shriek repeated at intervals."

They can form flocks of up to 8-10 birds.

Habitat and Conservation Status 
Its natural habitats at tropical moist lowland primary forest and secondary forest up to 1,300 meters above sea level. While they can tolerate secondary forest, they have the highest population densities and health in primary (old-growth) forest.

The IUCN Red List has assessed this bird as vulnerable with the population being estimated at 6,000 to 15,000 mature individuals. Its main threat is habitat destruction through both legal and Illegal logging, conversion into farmlands through Slash-and-burn, charcoal burning, and mining. Its preference for low altitudes suggests that it must have suffered population losses with the loss of lowland forest in the Philippines. Habitat loss on both Negros and Panay has been extensive. By 2007, Negros and Panay had a 3% and 6% remaining forest cover with most of this being higher elevation forest where this bird does not thrive in with these figures are still declining.

It occurs in a few protected areas on Northern Negros Natural Park, Mount Kanlaon National Park and Northwest Panay Peninsula Natural Park. However, as with most areas in the Philippines, protection from hunting and illegal logging is lax. 

Conservation actions proposed are surveys particularly on Panay, to identify further key populations. Formally protect the Central Panay Mountain Range and other key sites. Promote more effective protection measures for the Northern Negros Natural Park. Encourage careful reforestation activities around remaining forests with emphasis on native trees.

References

white-winged cuckooshrike
Birds of Panay
Birds of Negros Island
white-winged cuckooshrike
Taxonomy articles created by Polbot